Debden is a village in the Canadian province of Saskatchewan within the Rural Municipality of Canwood No. 494 and Census Division No. 16. The village is located on Highway 55 and is 94 km from the City of Prince Albert and 194 km from the City of Saskatoon. It is also the administrative headquarters of the Big River Cree First Nations band government. The village is at the edge of the Prince Albert National Park and with all the lakes nearby it becomes a popular area in the summer months.

History 
Debden incorporated as a village on June 7, 1922.

Demographics 

Notable people 
 Fred Sasakamoose, NHL player, first Indigenous NHL player

See also 

 List of communities in Saskatchewan
 Villages of Saskatchewan

References

Villages in Saskatchewan
Canwood No. 494, Saskatchewan
Division No. 16, Saskatchewan